Dalel Singh Ror is an Indian volleyball player who received one of the country's highest sporting honors, the Arjuna Award, in 1990. Dalel Singh was born on 10 June 1956 into a Ror family of Amin village near Kurukshetra, in Haryana.

References

Indian men's volleyball players
Living people
Recipients of the Arjuna Award
Volleyball players from Haryana
Kurukshetra University alumni
Year of birth missing (living people)
Asian Games medalists in volleyball
Volleyball players at the 1986 Asian Games
Medalists at the 1986 Asian Games
Asian Games bronze medalists for India